Thecacera is a genus of sea slugs, specifically nudibranchs, shell-less marine gastropod mollusks in the family Polyceridae.

Species
Species in the genus Thecacera include:
 Thecacera boyla Willan, 1989
 Thecacera darwini Pruvot-Fol, 1950
 Thecacera pacifica Bergh, 1883
 Thecacera pennigera (Montagu, 1815)
 Thecacera picta Baba, 1972
 Thecacera virescens Alder & Hancock, 1851
 Thecacera vittata Yonow, 1994

References

External links

 video of Thecacera pacifica

Polyceridae
Gastropod genera